Rafael Monteiro Alves da Silva (born January 25, 1984 in Presidente Prudente), known as Rafael Silva, is a Brazilian footballer who plays as defender.

Career statistics

References

External links

1984 births
Living people
Brazilian footballers
Association football defenders
Campeonato Brasileiro Série C players
União Agrícola Barbarense Futebol Clube players
Esporte Clube São Bento players
Marília Atlético Clube players
Clube Atlético Juventus players